Benjamin Benny (21 October 1869 – 10 February 1935) was an Australian politician.

History
Born in Aldinga, South Australia, he was educated at state schools and then the University of Adelaide, becoming a solicitor. He was Vice-President of the South Australian Law Society, and served as mayor of Brighton Council. In 1919, he was elected to the Australian Senate as a Nationalist Senator for South Australia. He did not recontest in 1925 and although his term was due to finish on 30 June 1926 he resigned from parliament on 26 January 1926 due to ill health, and was replaced by Alexander McLachlan. In June 1926 Benny was convicted of fraudulent conversion of trust funds and sentenced to three years' gaol, and declared insolvent.

He married his cousin Susan Grace Anderson, known as Grace Benny. After his imprisonment, she opened an employment agency to support her family, prior to this she had never worked for a living. She had in 1919 made history as the first woman to be elected to local government (the Seacliff ward of the Brighton Council) in Australia.

Benny died in 1935.

References

1869 births
1935 deaths
Nationalist Party of Australia members of the Parliament of Australia
Members of the Australian Senate for South Australia
Members of the Australian Senate
Mayors of places in South Australia
Australian politicians convicted of fraud
Australian white-collar criminals
20th-century Australian politicians